Brochymena punctata is a species of stink bug in the family Pentatomidae. It is found in North America.

Subspecies
These two subspecies belong to the species Brochymena punctata:
 Brochymena punctata pallida Blatchley, 1926
 Brochymena punctata punctata Van Duzee, 1909

References

Articles created by Qbugbot
Insects described in 1909
Halyini